Mahjong Cub3d, known in Japan as , is a Mahjong-based video game developed and published by Sunsoft, for the Nintendo 3DS. Atlus USA published the title in North America.

See also
 Mahjong video game

References

External links
 Sunsoft 
 Atlus
Mahjong Cub3D at MobyGames

2011 video games
Atlus games
Mahjong video games
Nintendo 3DS games
Nintendo 3DS-only games
Puzzle video games
Sunsoft games
Video games developed in Japan
Multiplayer and single-player video games